The 52nd Primetime Emmy Awards were held on Sunday, September 10, 2000. The ceremony was hosted by Garry Shandling and was broadcast on ABC. Two networks, Bravo and The WB, received their first major nominations. This remains the only year in which a show from The WB or its descendants received a major nomination.

For its second season, Will & Grace led all comedy series with three major wins, including Outstanding Comedy Series. Ally McBeal became the first defending champion, that wasn't cancelled or ended, that failed to be nominated for Outstanding Comedy Series since Get Smart in 1970.

The drama field was dominated by first year series The West Wing. In addition to winning Outstanding Drama Series, the series won five major awards total, leading all shows. Overall, when adding The West Wings technical categories, it won nine awards in a single year, a record that stood until Game of Thrones received twelve awards for their fifth season in 2015. In addition, James Gandolfini became the first HBO actor to win the Lead Actor, Drama Emmy, for The Sopranos.

Winners and nominees
Winners are listed first, highlighted in boldface, and indicated with a double dagger (‡). For simplicity, producers who received nominations for program awards have been omitted.

Programs

Acting

Lead performances

Supporting performances

Directing

Writing

Most major nominations
By network 
 NBC – 47
 HBO – 41
 ABC – 26
 CBS – 18

By program
 The Sopranos (HBO) – 10
 The Practice (ABC) / The West Wing (NBC) – 9
 Everybody Loves Raymond (CBS) – 8
 RKO 281 (HBO) / Will & Grace (NBC) – 7
 Frasier (NBC) / Friends (NBC) – 6

Most major awards
By network 
 NBC – 11
 HBO – 8
 ABC – 7
 CBS – 2
 Fox – 2

By program
 The West Wing (NBC) – 5
 The Corner (HBO) / Tuesdays with Morrie (ABC) / Will & Grace (NBC) – 3

Notes

In Memoriam

 Loretta Young
 Douglas Fairbanks Jr.
 Madeline Kahn
 John Gielgud
 George C. Scott
 Larry Linville
 Meredith MacRae
 Gene Rayburn
 Durward Kirby
 Shirley Hemphill
 Hoyt Axton
 Nancy Marchand
 Leonard Goldenson
 Clayton Moore
 Doug Henning
 Craig Stevens
 Mary Jane Croft
 Mabel King
 Charles M. Schulz
 Alec Guinness
 Walter Matthau

Notes

References

External links
 Emmys.com list of 2000 Nominees & Winners
 

052
Primetime Emmy Awards
2000 in Los Angeles
September 2000 events in the United States